James Thomson (born 1856, date of death unknown) was a Scottish-born Australian politician.

He worked as a miner in Fifeshire from the age of twelve, later moving to Lanarkshire. He migrated to New South Wales in 1874 and worked at the a number of mines, serving as President of the Miners' Association. From 1895 to 1901 he was the Labor member for Newcastle West in the New South Wales Legislative Assembly.<

References

 

1856 births
Year of death missing
Members of the New South Wales Legislative Assembly
Australian Labor Party members of the Parliament of New South Wales